Diego Morales may refer to:

 Diego Morales (boxer) (born 1979), Mexican boxer
 Diego Alberto Morales (born 1986), Argentine football striker for LDU Quito
 Diego Hernán Morales (born 1983), Argentine football goalkeeper for Alianza Universidad
 Diego Morales (politician) (born 1979), Guatemalan-American politician